Gaius Caecina Tuscus (Greek Gaius Kokina) was a 1st-century Roman politician and governor of Egypt during the reign of Nero, and is mentioned by Tacitus. Tuscus was a member of the Caecinae, an Etruscan family of Volaterrae, one of the ancient cities of Etruria.

Named Prefect of the Praetorian Guard 
According to Fabius Rusticus, he was named Prefect of the Praetorium in 56, in place of Burrus. But Caecina did not manage to take office, as Burrus retained control of the Praetorians through Seneca's influence.

Prefect of Egypt 
In 63, he was appointed governor of Egypt. There are papyrus records of Tuscus addressing concerned veteran soldiers. On the immunity of Roman legionaries, see P. Yale Inventory 1528.

On July 17, 64 AD, he is mentioned in a declaration of property in Oxyrhynchus.

In Alexandria, long-standing tensions between the Jews and Greek inhabitants led to riots in AD 66. Tuscus failed to control the situation. In 66, he was dismissed by the emperor when it became known that he had made use of the bathrooms that had been built for Nero's trip to Egypt and that Nero had to open. In May 66, Nero appointed Tiberius Alexander as Prefect of Egypt, one of the two most prestigious posts available to an equestrian along with Prefect of the Praetorian Guard.

Exile 
In 67, Caecina was exiled by Nero. However, he is known to have returned to Rome in 69.

References 

1st-century Roman governors of Egypt
1st-century Romans
Tuscus, Gaius
Praetorian prefects
Roman governors of Egypt